Thomas Meyer (born March 20, 1990) is an American soccer player.

Career

High school
Meyer attended St. Louis University High School in St. Louis while also playing for Scott Gallagher Soccer Club.

College and Amateur
Meyer played college soccer for the Indiana University Hoosiers between 2008 and 2011. During his time at Indiana, Meyer was named as a 2011 All-Big Ten Conference First Team and was second in the Big Ten Conference with 7 assists. He is also a member of the Sigma Chi Fraternity.

Meyer also spent time at the national residency program in 2005 and 2006, as well as spending time with USL Premier Development League club Seattle Wolves in 2009.

Professional
Los Angeles Galaxy selected Meyer in the first round (No. 19 overall) of the 2012 MLS SuperDraft.

Meyer made his debut for Los Angeles Galaxy in a 3–1 loss against Real Salt Lake on March 11, 2012.

LA released Meyer following the 2015 season. In January 2016, he signed with Swope Park Rangers of the United Soccer League.

Honors

Club
Los Angeles Galaxy
MLS Cup (2): 2012, 2014

References

External links
 

1990 births
Living people
American soccer players
Indiana Hoosiers men's soccer players
Washington Crossfire players
Chicago Fire U-23 players
LA Galaxy players
LA Galaxy II players
Soccer players from Missouri
LA Galaxy draft picks
USL League Two players
Major League Soccer players
USL Championship players
United States men's youth international soccer players
United States men's under-20 international soccer players
Association football defenders